Wimania is an extinct genus of coelacanth that lived during the Triassic period of Svalbard. It belonged to the family Coelacanthidae.

Species

Wimania multistriata Stensiö, 1921
Wimania sinuosa Stensiö, 1921

Coelacanthidae
Triassic bony fish
Prehistoric bony fish genera
Fossils of Svalbard
Triassic fish of Europe
Fossil taxa described in 1921